Fonso Branch (also called Fonso Creek) is a stream in the U.S. state of Missouri.

Fonso Branch has the name of Alfonso "Fonso" Boone, a pioneer citizen.

See also
List of rivers of Missouri

References

Rivers of Callaway County, Missouri
Rivers of Montgomery County, Missouri
Rivers of Missouri